The 1974 United States Senate election in Florida was held on November 5, 1974. Incumbent Senator Edward Gurney, a Republican, declined to seek a second term after being indicted for taking bribes in return for his influence with the Federal Housing Administration. The primary for the Republican nomination pitted Eckerd drug store owner Jack Eckerd against Florida Public Service Commissioner Paula Hawkins. Eckerd won handily, receiving approximately 67.5% of the vote. The Democratic primary, however, was a crowded field with eleven candidates vying for the nomination. Because no candidate received a majority of the votes, U.S. Representative Bill Gunter and Secretary of State of Florida Richard Stone advanced to a run-off election. Stone won by a small margin of 1.68%.

Thus, Eckerd and Stone faced off in the general election. John Grady, a family physician and member of George Wallace's American Independent Party, performed exceptionally well for a third-party candidate. Grady may have split the conservative vote, allowing Stone to win. On election day, Stone received 43.38% of the vote, Eckerd garnered 40.91% of the vote, and Grady acquired 15.7% of the vote. Stone served only one term in the Senate and would be defeated by Gunter in the Democratic primary in 1980.

Democratic primary

Candidates
Bob Brewster
George Balmer, Republican U.S. Senate candidate in 1970
Bill Gunter, U.S. Representative from Orlando
David B. Higginbottom, lawyer and candidate for the Florida House of Representatives in 1954 and 1956
Mallory Horne, President of the Florida Senate and former Speaker of the Florida House of Representatives
Neal Justin, Florida Atlantic University professor
Duaine E. Macon, real estate salesman
Richard A. Pettigrew, Florida State Senator and former Speaker of the Florida House of Representatives
Richard Stone, Secretary of State of Florida
Glenn W. Turner, super salesman
Burton Young, President of the Florida Bar

Republican primary

Candidates
Jack Eckerd, founder of Eckerd Corporation and 1966 gubernatorial candidate
Paula Hawkins, Florida Public Service Commissioner

Results

Third parties and Independents
Timothy L. "Tim" Adams
Hortense L. Arvan
Jim Fair, Hillsborough County Supervisor of Elections
John Grady, American Independent Party, family physician
Henry J. Matthews

General election

See also
 United States Senate elections, 1974 and 1975

External links
https://news.google.com/newspapers?nid=1755&dat=19740901&id=B_wjAAAAIBAJ&sjid=62YEAAAAIBAJ&pg=5866,535829&hl=en

Florida
1974
United States Senate